Gymnosporangium clavariiforme (Tongues of Fire) is a species of rust   fungus which alternately infects  Juniperus  and  hawthorns.

In junipers, the primary hosts, G. clavariiforme  produces a set of orange tentacle-like spore tubes called telial horns. These horns expand and have a jelly like consistency when wet. The spores are released and travel on the wind until they infect a hawthorn tree.

On the secondary hosts, the fungus produces yellowish depressions on the leaves. It also infects the fruit, which grows whitish tubes like a Medusa head. These are the spore tubes. The spores must then infect a juniper to complete the life cycle.

The fungus does not cause serious damage to junipers, but hawthorns can suffer serious loss of haw production due to the effects of the fungus.

References

Further reading
 Phillips, D. H., & Burdekin, D. A. (1992). Diseases of Forest and Ornamental Trees. Macmillan.
 Scharpf, R. F., ed. (1993). Diseases of Pacific Coast Conifers. USDA Forest Service Agricultural Handbook 521.

External links

Pucciniales
Fungi described in 1786
Galls